Haya Kay Rang is a Pakistani television soap opera which aired on ARY Zindagi.
The soap is produced by Fahad Mustafa and Dr Ali Kazmi under the production banner "Big Bang Entertainment". The serial stars Fahad Shaikh, Fazila Lashari, Natalia Awais and includes Amir Qureshi, Jana Malik, Afraz Rasool, Shabbir Jan, Sohail Sameer and Naheed Shabbir in supporting roles.

Cast
Fazila Lashari as Haya - Shafqat and Shaeela daughter, Noor's university friend
Natalia Awais as Noor - Sheharyar and Sumbul daughter, sister of Aamir
Fahad Shaikh as Aamir - Sheharyar and Sumbul son, brother of Noor
Sohail Sameer as Sheharyar - father of Aamir and Noor
Naheed Shabbir as Sumbul - mother of Aamir and Noor, Sheharyar's wife
Afraz Rasool as Hammad - Noor's love interest and Baqar son
Jana Malik as Erum - sister of Sheharyar
Amir Qureshi as Farhan - Erum's husband
Ali Ansari as Yousuf - Aqeela son, Haya's cousin and loves her
Shabbir Jan as Shafqat/Shakeel - father of Haya, Saba and Shehzad
Noshaba Javed as Shakeela - mother of Haya, Saba and Shehzad
Adla Khan as Rida - Aqeela daughter, sister of Yousuf
Hajra Yamin as Fiza - Baqar daughter, sister of Hammad
Shazia Qaiser as Aqeela - mother of Rida and Yousuf, sister of Shakeela
Mizna Waqas as Ramsha - employee in Sheharyar's firm, having affair with Farhan
Ammara Chaudhry as Saba - younger sister of Haya 
Fazal Hussain as Shehzad - younger brother of Haya and Saba
Sami Sani as Baqar- father of Fiza and Hammad
Fozia Mushtaq- mother of Farhan
Kiran Abbasi as Samreen- nurse at hospital caretaking Shakeel
Hammad Khan as Ali- fiance of Saba and later her husband
Aliya Jasmhed as Zeenat - Mother of Ali and Saba's mother-in-law
Nighat Zafar as Maheen - employee under Hammad
Agha Talal as Jibran - businessman having connection with Noor
Ahad Khan as Bilal - son of maid at Jibran whom who wants to marry his sister
Tahir Kazmi as Tahir - employee under Haya and Noor's neighbor
Maria Malik as Nasreen- Tahir's wife and Noor's neighbor
Adnan Gabol as Asad- Haya's ex boyfriend
Falak Naz as Bua- a matchmaker

Production
Haya Kay Rang is directed by Asad Mumtaz Malik who has previously directed Bhool and Mein Hari Piya.

References

External links
Haya Kay Rang-ARY Zindagi

Pakistani television soap operas
Pakistani drama television series
2016 Pakistani television series debuts
2018 Pakistani television series endings
Urdu-language television shows
ARY Zindagi original programming